Gunnel Channel is a channel,  wide and  long, situated in the south part of Hanusse Bay and separating Hansen Island from the west coast of Graham Land, Antarctica. It was first observed from the air and roughly charted in 1936 by the British Graham Land Expedition under John Rymill. It was surveyed from the ground in 1948 by the Falkland Islands Dependencies Survey who gave this descriptive name. The channel gives a false impression of such narrowness that a boat could not navigate it without scraping her "gunnels" (gunwales) on either side.

References

Channels of the Southern Ocean
Straits of Graham Land
Loubet Coast